Thachia is a genus of air-breathing land snails, terrestrial pulmonate gastropod mollusks in the family Streptaxidae.

Species
 Thachia ninhhoaensis F. Huber, 2018

References

 Thach, N. N. (2018). New shells of South Asia. Seashells-Landsnails-Freshwater Shells. 3 New Genera, 132 New Species & Subspecies. 48HRBooks Company, Akron, Ohio, USA. 173 pp.

Streptaxidae